Joseph David-Jones (born December 22, 1993) is an American actor, known for his roles in the TV dramas Nashville and Arrow.

Early life and career 
David-Jones was born in 1993, in Los Angeles, and grew up in Florence, Kentucky. He earned a full scholarship to the University of Kentucky where he earned a bachelor's degree in mechanical engineering. While growing up, Jones began modeling with local Kentucky-based brands. During his time in college, he participated in the International Models & Talent competition in New York City. He won the "Actor of the Year" award. Three days later, he returned home and pursued his acting career.
In 2016, he played Hollis in The Divergent Series: Allegiant. He also played the role of John Diggle Jr. on The CW series Legends of Tomorrow. Other film roles he was in included films Detroit and Roman J. Israel, Esq.. He reprised the role of Connor Hawke on  Arrow. He was upgraded to series regular for the final season.

Personal life
David-Jones resides in Los Angeles, California. He finds joy filling his downtime with various musical endeavors, playing the guitar and piano. On the charity side, he sponsors and donates to the Save the Children Foundation, which brings support and necessities to children living in underprivileged environments.

Filmography

Film

Television

References

External links

Living people
American male film actors
American male television actors
21st-century American male actors
Male actors from Los Angeles
People from Florence, Kentucky
University of Kentucky alumni
1993 births